Emmerich Blagoevich also spelled Emmerich Freiherr von Blagoevich (1784–1850) was a general and field marshal lieutenant in the Austrian Empire.

Emmerich Blagojevich was born to a wealthy Serbian family in Vienna in 1784. He joined the Imperial-Royal Army as a graduate cadet of a military college in 1800. In 1809, he was promoted to the rank of captain. He particularly distinguished himself at the Battle of Hanau in 1813 and was awarded the Military Order of Maria Theresa in 1815. In 1820 his social status was elevated to Freiherr; in 1829 he became a colonel and in 1835 he was made General major; and in 1844 he became Field Marshal Lieutenant of the Military and Border District in Bukovina. He was promoted to commander-general in Slavonia in 1848. After the Revolution of 1848, he was criticized because of his behavior in the fortress Petrovaradin, which during the battle fell into the hands of the insurgents. He was court-martialed and retired. He died in Vienna on 21 January 1850.

Bibliography
 L. Hirtenfeld; Hirtenfeld-Meynert 1; N.A. Vienna; Wurzbach.
PUBLICATION: ÖBL 1815–1950, Bd. 1 (Lfg. 1, 1954), p. 91

References 

Generals from the Austrian Empire
Lieutenant field marshals from the Austrian Empire
1784 births
1850 deaths